James Anthony Murphy (September 12, 1894 – September 15, 1924) was an American race car driver who won the 1921 French Grand Prix, the 1922 Indianapolis 500, and the American Racing Championship in 1922 and 1924.

Background

Murphy was born in San Francisco, California, on Minna Street, between 7th and 8th, in September 1894. His father
was an immigrant from County Wexford, Ireland and his mother was an immigrant from [County Mayo, Ireland] and owned a fuel and feed store which fronted on Mission Street behind the family home on Minna. This area of San Francisco was called "South of the Slot" by locals in those days, and comprised a sprawling ghetto of mostly Irish immigrants and their children who made up the majority of the local labor force.

Murphy's mother Margaret died in Needles, CA in 1897 when Jimmy was 3 years old .  Murphy's father Mathew died in Jul 1906 in San Francisco, a couple of months after the 1906 San Francisco earthquake. Jimmy was then an orphan and became in the care of his paternal uncle James Murphy in San Francisco.  Jimmy's first cousin was 1906 San Francisco firefighter Battalion Chief Tom J. Murphy (later to become San Francisco's assistant fire chief 1925 and recognized as one of the pioneers of modern firefighting in San Francisco). 

Murphy lived with his paternal uncle James and wife Annie in their home in San Francisco until late 1907, when Murphy's maternal aunt, Mary Moran and her husband, Judge Martin O'Donnell of Vernon, California, sent for Jimmy to come live with them.

In Southern California Murphy attended Huntington Park High School and commuted to and from school on a motorcycle given him by Judge O'Donnell. He became an expert rider and mechanic and, a few months short of graduation, opened a garage with a friend, developing a clientele of motorcycle and automobile owners from the Los Angeles area.

Riding mechanic
Murphy began his racing career as a riding mechanic, back in the days when racing cars carried a driver and a "mechanician."

Murphy rode with some of America's greatest drivers of the time, including Ralph DePalma, Harry Hartz, Eddie Rickenbacker, Peter DePaolo and Tommy Milton.

Racer

After the war, Murphy's career as a driver was spotted, but he showed promise to those who knew "the racing game." To everyone (except Milton's) surprise, Murphy won that February 14, 1920 race. He went on to win regularly and became a popular champion on the circuit.

In 1921, as part of a team of Duesenbergs sponsored by French immigrant Albert Champion, he became the only American to have won a Grand Prix race in an all-American car, by winning the French Grand Prix at Le Mans. The next time an American driver would win a Grand Prix in an American-built car would be 46 years later, when Dan Gurney won the 1967 Belgian Grand Prix. Additionally, in 1967 Gurney became the second American driving an American built car to win at LeMans.

So since the 1921 French Grand Prix was raced on the LeMans course, Gurney was the second American driver to win LeMans driving an American built vehicle. The feat of an all-American Grand Prix victory has not been repeated. Murphy's mechanic in that race was none other than Ernie Olsen who also rode with Murphy in the 1922 Indianapolis 500. Murphy's victory was not a hollow one as he was facing the best teams from England (Sunbeam) with young gun Henry Segrave driving a 1921 Grand Prix car and France (Ballot) led by the experienced Jean Chassagne.

In 1922, Murphy won the Indianapolis 500, in the Le Mans winning car, which had been modified for the Indy race and was powered by a Miller engine. He also became National Champion that year. Murphy won the final Universal Trophy Cup Race, beating Milton, at both Tacoma Speedway and the Uniontown Speedway board track in 1922.

In 1923, Murphy placed second in the National Championship, even missing several races to go to Europe and race for Los Angeles race car builder, Harry Miller. He placed third in the Italian Grand Prix at Monza that year, in a race whose Grand Marshal was Benito Mussolini. Mussolini gave him two German Shepherd dogs as Murphy loved dogs.

Murphy's success continued in 1924. Murphy finished third in the Indy 500, and by the last weeks of the season, he had accumulated an unbeatable lead in the points toward the Championship.

Murphy died in a race promoted by a friend, at the Syracuse, New York fairgrounds dirt track on September 15, 1924. (see below.)

Indianapolis 500 results

Award
He was inducted into the Motorsports Hall of Fame of America in 1998.

Death
Although not an accomplished dirt racer, he agreed to appear at a race promoted by a friend, at the Syracuse, New York fairgrounds dirt track on September 15, 1924. As he charged for the lead late in the race on lap 138 of 150, his car slid sideways, possibly hitting oil or a part failure causing it, and crashed through the inside wooden rail. A large piece of the rail was pushed through Murphy’s chest, impaling him and killing him instantly. 

Murphy was buried at Calvary Cemetery in East Los Angeles, in the O'Donnell family plot. His death made headlines across the country. His funeral was attended by most of the great drivers and racing entrepreneurs, engineers and promoters of the time. In a precedent-setting move, the American Automobile Association's Competition Board awarded the 1924 National Championship posthumously, to Murphy. At the funeral, Fred J. Wagner, Chief Starter for the AAA's Contest Board, said in his eulogy,

Sportsmanship, like every other moral quality is not instinctive. It must be acquired. Jimmy Murphy, as no other, possessed the quality of a 100% sportsman. Invariably, when he won, he attributed his success to the goddess of fortune. He carried his honors more blithely than any other man I have ever come in contact with in my 30 years as an official. He accepted victory without a sneer or a strut, and defeat without a whimper. He was one in a million.

See also
American Championship car racing

References
Information on Murphy’s life has been gathered from various sources, including the original record books of the old AAA's Contest board, from newspapers of the time including the San Francisco Chronicle, the San Francisco Examiner and the Los Angeles Times; from the annals of the Roman Catholic Archdiocese of San Francisco, Jerry Grant of the Champion Spark Plug Company, and the public relations department of the AC/Delco Division of General Motors, as well as a personal interview with the late Peter DePaolo, who was a contemporary of Murphy.

External links

1894 births
1924 deaths
AAA Championship Car drivers
American people of Irish descent
American racing drivers
Champ Car champions
Duesenberg
Indianapolis 500 drivers
Indianapolis 500 polesitters
Indianapolis 500 winners
Racing drivers who died while racing
Racing drivers from San Francisco
Sports deaths in New York (state)